The 1832 Massachusetts gubernatorial election was held on November 12.

National Republican Governor Levi Lincoln Jr. was re-elected to a ninth term in office over Democrat Marcus Morton and Anti-Mason Samuel Lathrop.

General election

Candidates
Samuel Lathrop, former U.S. Representative and State Senator from West Springfield (Anti-Masonic)
Levi Lincoln Jr., incumbent Governor since 1825 (National Republican)
Marcus Morton, Associate Justice of the Supreme Judicial Court, former acting Governor and nominee since 1828 (Democratic)

Campaign
The Anti-Masonic Party, which was now controlled by former Democrats, was growing in strength. The party positioned itself in opposition to Henry Clay, a Mason and the National Republican presidential candidate, by declaring him "far behind the ordinary standard of morals" with "no virtuous example in his private life." This created a conundrum for Anti-Masonic nominee Samuel Lathrop, a friend of Clay.

Democratic candidate Marcus Morton, who had campaigned actively in the preceding three elections, sought to withdraw his name but was persuaded to stay on the ticket by party leader David Henshaw. Morton accepted his role as the state's advocate for the Andrew Jackson campaign but saw little hope of victory and privately expressed that he had no influence over anyone but his son Marcus Jr.

Jackson's veto of the renewal of the national bank charter and his declaration against concentrated wealth consolidated conservative elements against him and may have buoyed the National Republican vote in the state.

Results
Lincoln and Henry Clay carried the state with more than twice the vote of their nearest competitor, with the Democrats finishing third in both races. Turnout increased, though this time with most of the new votes going to the National Republicans and Democrats.

See also
 1832 Massachusetts legislature

References

Governor
1832
Massachusetts
November 1832 events